Lameck Banda (born 29 January 2001) is a Zambian professional footballer who plays as a winger for  club Lecce and the Zambia national team.

Club career
On 10 July 2019, Banda signed a contract with Russian Premier League club FC Arsenal Tula. He joined his compatriots Evans Kangwa and Kings Kangwa at the club.

He made his debut in the Russian Premier League for Arsenal Tula on 12 July 2019 in a season-opening game against FC Dynamo Moscow, as a starter.

On 3 September 2020, Banda signed with Maccabi Netanya. On 7 September 2020, Arsenal Tula confirmed the transfer and announced that it is a loan until May 2021. On 6 August 2021, he returned to Israel, joining Maccabi Petah Tikva on a season-long loan with an option to buy.

On 4 August 2022, Banda joined newly-promoted Serie A club U.S. Lecce on a permanent deal, signing a four-year deal with an option for a fifth season. He then made his debut for the Italian club on 13 August, coming on as a substitute for Federico de Francesco in the 74th minute of a 2–1 league loss against Inter Milan. By doing so, he became the first Zambian player to ever feature in a Serie A match.

On 4 January 2023, Banda was racially abused, together with his team-mate Samuel Umtiti, by a group of away supporters during a home league game against Lazio. The Lazio fans involved kept targeting the two players with racist chants throughout most part of the match, with referee Livio Martinelli being forced to interrupt the game for a few minutes during the second half – although the Zambian player had already been substituted at half time. The game eventually ended in a 2–1 win for Lecce. The club's president himself, Saverio Sticchi Damiani, defended both the abused players in the post-match. Lazio apologised for the behaviour of their supporters by issuing an official statement on social media, while FIFA president Gianni Infantino showed support to Umtiti and Banda through a message on his Instagram profile.

International career
Banda has been capped by Zambia at the under-17, under-20 and under-23 levels. He debuted for the senior Zambia national team in a friendly 3–1 win over the Congo on 25 March 2022.

References

External links
 

2001 births
Living people
Zambian footballers
Association football midfielders
Zambia international footballers
Zambia under-20 international footballers
Zambia youth international footballers
2019 Africa U-23 Cup of Nations players
Nkwazi F.C. players
ZESCO United F.C. players
FC Arsenal Tula players
Maccabi Netanya F.C. players
Maccabi Petah Tikva F.C. players
U.S. Lecce players
Russian Premier League players
Israeli Premier League players
Serie A players
Zambian expatriate footballers
Zambian expatriate sportspeople in Russia
Expatriate footballers in Russia
Zambian expatriate sportspeople in Israel
Expatriate footballers in Israel
Zambian expatriate sportspeople in Italy
Expatriate footballers in Italy